Jilin University of Finance and Economics is a university in Changchun, Jilin province, northeast China. The university was former Changchun Tax College, and was renamed in March 2010.

External links
Jilin University of Finance and Economics

 
Universities and colleges in Jilin
Business schools in China